The Fukuoka International Cross Country is an annual cross country running competition which takes place in Fukuoka, Japan in either late February or Early March. It is one of the IAAF permit meetings which serve as qualifying events for the IAAF World Cross Country Championships.

First held in 1987, the Fukuoka Cross Country is held at the National Cross Country Course near the Uminonakamichi Seaside Park in Higashi-ku, Fukuoka. The course is a purpose-built cross country venue that was created as the host course for the 2006 IAAF World Cross Country Championships.

The meet features a competition schedule of eight races. These include a senior men's course (10 km) and a senior women's course (6 km). A total of four junior races take place, with long courses of 8 km for men and 6 km for women, as well as 4 km short course for both junior sexes. Furthermore, there are two relay races for high school athletes which have legs of 2 km per runner.

Four of the races act as qualifiers for the World Cross Country Championship: the men's 10 km and the women's 6 km allow athletes to enter the senior world competition while the junior men's 8 km and junior women's 6 km enable runners to qualify for the junior section of the championships. The competition is one of three in which Japanese athletes can qualify for the World Championships; the others being the annual Chiba International Cross Country and the biennial Asian Cross Country Championships.

A small contingent of foreign athletes are invited each year, but the fields of each race largely comprise Japanese runners. Previous winners include Olympic gold medallist Samuel Wanjiru, who first won at the age of 16, and won three times consecutively between 2003 and 2005. World and Olympic gold medallist Meseret Defar has also competed, winning the 2005 women's race.

The competition is televised on local Japan News Network channels by the Tokyo Broadcasting System. The Fukuoka Cross Country meeting is one of the prefecture's top annual athletics events, along with the Fukuoka International Open Marathon Championship.

Past senior race winners

Key:   
Note: Race data unavailable prior to 1995.

References

External links
Japanese Athletics Association website

Cross country running competitions
Athletics competitions in Japan
Recurring sporting events established in 1987
Cross country
Cross country running in Japan
Annual sporting events in Japan
1987 establishments in Japan